Håkan Nesser (born 21 February 1950) is a Swedish author and teacher who has written a number of successful novels, mostly but not only crime fiction. He has won Best Swedish Crime Novel Award three times, and his novel Carambole won the prestigious Glass Key award in 2000. His books have been translated from Swedish into more than twenty languages.

Early life
Håkan Nesser was born and grew up in Kumla, Örebro County. His first novel was published in 1988. He worked as a teacher in Uppsala until 1998 when he became a full-time author. In August 2006, Håkan Nesser and his wife Elke (a psychiatrist) moved to Greenwich Village in New York. A few years later the couple moved to London since it was easier for his wife to find work there. Having returned to Sweden, they now live in Stockholm and on the island Furillen in the Baltic Sea.

Characters and themes
A recurring main character is called Van Veeteren, a detective in the early novels and later the owner of an antique books shop. These books play out in a fictitious city called Maardam, said to be located in northern Europe in a country which is never named but resembles Sweden, the Netherlands, Poland and Germany. The names however are mostly Dutch.

With his 2006 crime novel Människa utan hund ("Human without Dog") Nesser introduced a new main character, Inspector Gunnar Barbarotti, a Swedish police inspector of Italian descent. He has remained the main protagonist in Nesser's crime books since then. Barbarotti is a more upbeat character than Van Veeteren and the books are firmly set in Sweden, although the town of Kymlinge is fictitious and named after an "abandoned tube station" in Stockholm.

In August 2011 he hinted on his own site that a future book (which became The Living and the Dead in Winsford) would take place in the "county of Somerset".

Bibliography

Inspector Van Veeteren
1993 – Det grovmaskiga nätet; English translation: The Mind's Eye, 2008
1994 – Borkmanns punkt; English translation: Borkmann's Point, 2006
1995 – Återkomsten; English translation: The Return, 2007
1996 – Kvinna med födelsemärke; English translation: Woman with Birthmark, 2009
1997 – Kommissarien och tystnaden; English translation: The Chief Inspector and Silence, 2010
1998 – Münsters fall: English translation: The Unlucky Lottery, 2011 (Münster's Case, USA, 2012)
1999 – Carambole; English translation: Hour of the Wolf, 2012
2000 – Ewa Morenos fall; English translation: The Weeping Girl, 2013
2001 – Svalan, katten, rosen, döden; English translation: The Strangler's Honeymoon, 2013
2003 – Fallet G; English translation: The G File, 2014

Inspector Barbarotti
2006 – Människa utan hund; English translation: The Darkest Day, 2017
2007 – En helt annan historia; English translation: The Root of Evil, 2018
2008 – Berättelse om herr Roos; English translation: The Secret Life of Mr. Roos, 2020
2010 – De ensamma
2012 – Styckerskan från Lilla Burma
2020 – Den sorgsne busschauffören från Alster
2021 – Schack under vulkanen

Other novels
1988 – Koreografen
1996 – Barins triangel
1998 – Kim Novak badade aldrig i Genesarets sjö; English translation by Saskia Vogel: A Summer with Kim Novak (2015)
1999 – Flugan och evigheten
2002 – Och Piccadilly Circus ligger inte i Kumla
2002 – Kära Agnes!
2004 – Skuggorna och regnet
2005 – Från doktor Klimkes horisont
2009 – Maskarna på Carmine Street
2011 – Himmel över London
2014 – Levande och döda i Winsford; English translation: The Living and the Dead in Winsford (2015)
2016 – Eugen Kallmanns ögon
2017 – Nortons filosofiska memoarer; English translation: Norton's Philosophical Memoirs (2018)
2018 – INTRIGO (a collection of novellas: Tom (2018); Rein (1996); Dear Agnes (2002); The Flower from Samaria (2005); All the Information in the Case (2005))
2018 – De vänsterhäntas förening
2019 – Halvmördaran

Filmography
Kim Novak Never Swam in Genesaret's Lake (Kim Novak badade aldrig i Genesarets sjö) 2005
Van Veeteren series
Det grovmaskiga nätet (2000, TV)
Återkomsten (2001, TV) 
Kvinna med födelsemärke (2001, TV)
Münsters fall (2005) 
Carambole (2005) 
Borkmanns punkt (2005) 
Moreno och tystnaden (2006) 
Svalan, katten, rosen, döden (2006) 
Fallet G (2006)

Awards
 1994 – Best Swedish Crime Novel Award for Borkmanns punkt
 1996 – Best Swedish Crime Novel Award for Kvinna med födelsemärke
 2000 – Glass Key award for Carambole
 2007 – Best Swedish Crime Novel Award for En helt annan historia
 2016 – Honorary doctorate from Örebro University
 2019 - H. M. The King's Medal for his work as an author

References

External links
 Official website 
 Håkan Nesser at Pan Macmillan

1950 births
Living people
People from Kumla Municipality
Writers from Närke
Swedish-language writers
Swedish crime fiction writers
Uppsala University alumni
Sommar (radio program) hosts